Taviani is an Italian surname. Notable people with the surname include:

 Giuliano Taviani (born 1969), Italian composer
 Lina Nerli Taviani (born 1937), Italian costume designer, and wife of film director Paolo Taviani
 Paolo Emilio Taviani (1912–2001), Italian political leader, economist and historian
 Paolo and Vittorio Taviani, collectively referred to as the Taviani brothers, Italian film directors and screenwriters

Italian-language surnames